This is a partial discography of albums and singles released by Swing Out Sister. To date, the group has released ten studio albums. In addition, they have put out various other live, compilation or remix albums, some of which are only available in certain regions of the world.

Albums

Studio albums

Compilation albums
1990: Swing Out Fever
1991: Splendid Collection
1996: Best of Swing Out Sister
1997: Super Best
2001: Breakout: The Very Best of Swing Out Sister
2001: 20th Century Masters: Swing Out Sister Millennium Collection
2002: Cafe Orange - Swing Out Sister CAFE Best
2003: The Ultimate Collection
2004: The Ultimate Collection (revised track listing)
2009: Best Selection
2010: Private View (rearranged previously released versions)
2014: The Essential Swing Out Sister
2022: Blue Mood, Breakout & Beyond

Other albums
1987: Another Non-Stop Sister
1989: Windmills of Your Mind (EP Japan)
1990: Swing 3
1992: Swing Out Singles
1996: The Big Elsewhere (EP)
2009: les étrangers (soundtrack)
2015: Rushes (work in progress materiel from Pledgemusic for the album Almost Persuaded)
2018: Almost Persuaded (limited edition vinyl edition & mail order/concert sold instrumental CD)

Live albums
1993: Live at the Jazz Café
2005: Live in Tokyo

Singles

References

Discographies of British artists
Pop music group discographies